Trifurcula istriae is a moth of the family Nepticulidae. It is only known from Croatia and northern Italy.

The larvae feed on Globularia punctata. They mine the leaves of their host plant. The mine consists of a spiral, continued into a very narrow corridor, that only little widens further on. The larva uses a single leaf for its development.

External links
bladmineerders.nl
Fauna Europaea

Nepticulidae
Moths of Europe